Kareigawa Station (Kareigawa-eki) is a train station on the Hisatsu Line operated by Kyushu Railway Company (JR Kyushu) located in Kareigawa, Hayato-cho, Kirishima City, Kagoshima Prefecture. The station building is the oldest in the prefecture and is registered as a National Registered Tangible Cultural Property, managed by the local government. Until 2022, it was one of the few unmanned stations in the country to have a limited express train stop.

The station began operation on January 15, 1903, with one stationmaster, one ticket and telegraph clerk, and five station attendants. The station was the gateway to the Myoken Onsen hot spring, and as such, it served as a hub for the transport of luggage and goods.

The station was bustling with activity, as it served as a loading and unloading point for fertilizer and crops bound for the Jusanzuka plateau until it was unmanned in 1984. In 2003, former station employees organized a 100th anniversary celebration, but JR Kyushu did not take notice due to the station's small size. Nonetheless, the celebration attracted 1,300 people, and the station was purchased by JR Kyushu in 2004 for its commemorative and cultural value. After the opening of the Kyushu Shinkansen, the limited express train "Hayato no Kaze" began stopping at the station to promote the economic benefits of the high-speed rail line.

Lines
Kareigawa Station is served by the Hisatsu Line.

Surrounding area
Kagoshima Airport
Kagoshima Prefectural Road Route 56
Shinkawa Keikoku Onsen
Kareigawa Post Office

See also
 List of railway stations in Japan

References

External links

  

Railway stations in Japan opened in 1903
Railway stations in Kagoshima Prefecture